Martin Carl Albrecht AC, FTSE, FIE Aust, FAICD, FAIM, is a prominent Australian businessman, best known for his service as chairman, previously CEO (1985–2000), of Thiess. In June 2002 he was appointed a Companion of the Order of Australia "For service to the construction industry, to the development of export markets, to the engineering profession, and to the community in the areas of education, corporate social responsibility and industrial safety."

Education and qualifications
B.Tech (Civil Engineering)
Immanuel College, Adelaide
Alice Springs High School
Fellow of the Australian Academy of Technological Sciences and Engineering
Hon. Fellow of the Institution of Engineers Australia
Fellow of the Australian Institute of Company Directors

Directorships and Board positions
Chairman, National Trunk Rail (NTR)
Chairman, Exergen
Director, Regional River Festival - Bremer to Bay
Patron, Wesley Medical Research
Patron, Brisbane Regional Youth Orchestra
1985-2000 CEO, Thiess
2001-2008 Chairman, Thiess
1999-2003 Nonexecutive Director, Cliffs Asia Pacific Iron Ore Holdingsref name="businessweek" />
2001-2010 (Founding) Chairman Emeritus, Geodynamics
2001-2008 Nonexecutive Director, Leighton Holdings
2003-2010 Founding Chairman, International RiverFoundation
2004-2013 Chairman, Wesley Research Institute  
Former Director, International RiverFoundation
Former Trustee, The Queensland Museum Foundation
Former, Board of Governors, Committee for Economic Development of Australia
Former Member, Federal Government Construction Industry Development Authority
Former Director, Portman Limited
Former Director, Siemens Australia Advisory Board
Former Director, QGC
Former Director, Australian Prospectors & Miners' Hall of Fame
Former Director, 2001 Goodwill Games Board
Former Chairman, Lifestream Foundation
Former Chairman, Queensland Government Landmark Building Taskforce
Former Member, Queensland Premier's Business Round Table
Former Member, Queensland Government Vocational Education Training Commission

Honours and awards
2002 Companion of the Order of Australia
2001 Centenary Medal
2000 Service "Cross of the Order of Merit - First Class" - Federal Republic of Germany
2001 Australian Constructors Association, Services to Construction Award
2003 QUT Distinguished Constructors Award
Honorary Doctorate, University of Queensland
Honorary Doctorate, Queensland University of Technology
Honorary Doctorate, Griffith University
Honorary Doctorate, University of SA
Honorary Fellow, Engineers Australia
2006 Inducted Hall of Fame - Engineers Australia (Qld) Division - Gold Medal 
2008 EPA Queensland - Inaugural Premier's Award for Leadership in Business Sustainability
2008 Australian Institute of Company Directors (Qld) - Gold Medal

References

External links
 ATSE Workshop Program, 23 August 2011, www.atse.org.au
 ceda; exergen; Wesley Research Institute;  Australian Construction Achievement Awards; Honorary Doctor of the University of South Australia (DUniv); Geodynamics; etc.

Companions of the Order of Australia
Recipients of the Centenary Medal
Fellows of the Australian Academy of Technological Sciences and Engineering
Fellows of the Australian Institute of Management
Fellows of the Australian Institute of Company Directors
Living people
Year of birth missing (living people)
People educated at Immanuel College, Adelaide